Corrigiola, the strapworts, are a genus of flowering plants in the family Caryophyllaceae, with a highly disjunct distribution in Mexico, South America, southern and eastern Africa, Madagascar, northwestern Africa, Europe and western Asia. Together with Telephium they form the tribe Corrigioleae.

Species
Currently accepted species include:

Corrigiola andina Planch. & Triana
Corrigiola capensis Willd.
Corrigiola crassifolia Chaudhri
Corrigiola drymarioides Baker f.
Corrigiola litoralis L.
Corrigiola madagascariensis (Baker) H.Perrier
Corrigiola palaestina Chaudhri
Corrigiola paniculata Peter
Corrigiola propinqua Gay
Corrigiola squamosa Hook. & Arn.
Corrigiola telephiifolia Pourr.
Corrigiola vulcanica Ikonn.

References

Caryophyllaceae
Caryophyllaceae genera